Chrysoprasis is a genus of beetles in the family Cerambycidae, containing the following species:

 Chrysoprasis abyara Napp & Martins, 1998
 Chrysoprasis aeneicollis (Buquet in Guérin-Méneville, 1844)
 Chrysoprasis aeneiventris Bates, 1870
 Chrysoprasis airi Napp & Martins, 1997
 Chrysoprasis atrata Bates, 1872
 Chrysoprasis aurata Aurivillius, 1910
 Chrysoprasis aureicollis White, 1853
 Chrysoprasis aurigena (Germar, 1824)
 Chrysoprasis auriventris Redtenbacher, 1868
 Chrysoprasis basalis Chevrolat, 1859
 Chrysoprasis beraba Napp & Martins, 1997
 Chrysoprasis bicolor (Olivier, 1790)
 Chrysoprasis bipartita Zajciw, 1963
 Chrysoprasis catarina Napp & Martins, 1998
 Chrysoprasis chalybea Redtenbacher, 1868
 Chrysoprasis chevrolati Lameere, 1884
 Chrysoprasis collaris Chevrolat, 1859
 Chrysoprasis concolor Redtenbacher, 1868
 Chrysoprasis cuiciuna Napp & Martins, 1998
 Chrysoprasis dutreuxi Lameere, 1884
 Chrysoprasis festiva Audinet-Serville, 1834
 Chrysoprasis globulicollis Zajciw, 1958
 Chrysoprasis grupiara Napp & Martins, 2009
 Chrysoprasis guerrerensis Bates, 1892
 Chrysoprasis hirtula White, 1853
 Chrysoprasis hispidula Bates, 1870
 Chrysoprasis hypocrita Erichson, 1847
 Chrysoprasis ibaca Napp & Martins, 1997
 Chrysoprasis icuara Napp & Martins, 1998
 Chrysoprasis itaiuba Napp & Martins, 1997
 Chrysoprasis linearis Bates, 1870
 Chrysoprasis marta Napp & Martins, 1999
 Chrysoprasis melanostetha Bates, 1870
 Chrysoprasis moerens White, 1853
 Chrysoprasis morana Napp & Martins, 2009
 Chrysoprasis nana Bates, 1870
 Chrysoprasis nigrina Bates, 1870
 Chrysoprasis nigristernis Zajciw, 1960
 Chrysoprasis nitidisternis Zajciw, 1960
 Chrysoprasis nymphula Bates, 1870
 Chrysoprasis obiuna Napp & Martins, 1997
 Chrysoprasis pacifica Napp & Martins, 1995
 Chrysoprasis para Napp & Martins, 1998
 Chrysoprasis pilosa Galileo & Martins, 2003
 Chrysoprasis piriana Napp & Martins, 1999
 Chrysoprasis pitanga Napp & Martins, 1999
 Chrysoprasis poticuara Napp & Martins, 1997
 Chrysoprasis potiuna Napp & Martins, 1997
 Chrysoprasis principalis Napp & Martins, 2009
 Chrysoprasis punctulata Bates, 1870
 Chrysoprasis quadrimaculata Gounelle, 1913
 Chrysoprasis reticulicollis Zajciw, 1958
 Chrysoprasis ritcheri Gounelle, 1913
 Chrysoprasis rotundicollis Bates, 1870
 Chrysoprasis rubricollis Napp & Martins, 2006
 Chrysoprasis rugulicollis Bates, 1870
 Chrysoprasis sapphirina Gounelle, 1911
 Chrysoprasis seticornis Bates, 1880
 Chrysoprasis sobrina Bates, 1870
 Chrysoprasis suturalis Lameere, 1884
 Chrysoprasis suturella White, 1853
 Chrysoprasis tendira Napp & Martins, 1998
 Chrysoprasis timapeba Napp & Martins, 1997
 Chrysoprasis tobiuna Napp & Martins, 1998
 Chrysoprasis tybyra Napp & Martins, 1998
 Chrysoprasis valida Bates, 1870
 Chrysoprasis variabilis Zajciw, 1958
 Chrysoprasis viridis Fisher, 1944
 Chrysoprasis vittata Aurivillius, 1910

References

 
Heteropsini